The canton of Saint-Héand is a French former administrative division located in the department of Loire and the Rhône-Alpes region. It was disbanded following the French canton reorganisation which came into effect in March 2015. It consisted of 9 communes, which joined the new canton of Sorbiers in 2015. It had 29,539 inhabitants (2012).

The canton comprised the following communes:

L'Étrat
Fontanès
La Fouillouse
Marcenod
Saint-Christo-en-Jarez
Saint-Héand
Sorbiers
La Talaudière
La Tour-en-Jarez

See also
Cantons of the Loire department

References

Former cantons of Loire (department)
2015 disestablishments in France
States and territories disestablished in 2015